John Wilson (born October 24, 1983) was a Democratic member of the Kansas House of Representatives representing the 10th district, which encompasses parts of Lawrence and all of southeastern Douglas County. First elected in 2012, Wilson resigned his seat in 2017 to focus on his work and family.

References

External links
State page
Campaign website
Ballotpedia
Follow the money

Democratic Party members of the Kansas House of Representatives
Living people
Politicians from Lawrence, Kansas
1983 births
21st-century American politicians